Pilot Grove is a city in the Pilot Grove Township in northern Cooper County, Missouri, United States. The population was 768 at the 2010 census.

History
Pilot Grove was platted in 1873. The city was named from an old-growth grove of hickory trees, which once served as a local landmark or "pilot" to travelers.

Geography
Pilot Grove is located along Missouri Route 135 and is four miles south of I-70. It is approximately eleven miles southwest of Boonville. The Petite Saline Creek flows past about two miles to the east of the town.

Demographics

2010 census
As of the census of 2010, there were 768 people, 304 households, and 193 families living in the city. The racial makeup of the city was 96.5% White, 1.3% African American, 0.4% Native American, 0.4% Asian, and 1.4% from two or more races. Hispanic or Latino of any race were 1.0% of the population.

There were 304 households, of which 30.9% had children under the age of 18 living with them, 47.4% were married couples living together, 12.5% had a female householder with no husband present, 3.6% had a male householder with no wife present, and 36.5% were non-families. 34.2% of all households were made up of individuals, and 20.4% had someone living alone who was 65 years of age or older. The average household size was 2.33 and the average family size was 2.93.

The median age in the city was 43.4 years. 23.4% of residents were under the age of 18; 5.5% were between the ages of 18 and 24; 23.8% were from 25 to 44; 21.9% were from 45 to 64; and 25.3% were 65 years of age or older. The gender makeup of the city was 44.7% male and 55.3% female.

2000 census
As of the census of 2000, there were 723 people, 287 households, and 187 families living in the city. The population density was 1,724.8 people per square mile (664.6/km). There were 317 housing units at an average density of 756.2 per square mile (291.4/km). The racial makeup of the city was 97.37% White, 0.97% African American, 0.69% Native American, and 0.97% from two or more races. Hispanic or Latino of any race were 0.55% of the population.

There were 287 households, out of which 27.9% had children under the age of 18 living with them, 50.5% were married couples living together, 11.8% had a female householder with no husband present, and 34.5% were non-families. 31.7% of all households were made up of individuals, and 15.7% had someone living alone who was 65 years of age or older. The average household size was 2.31 and the average family size was 2.89.

In the city the population was spread out, with 21.3% under the age of 18, 9.8% from 18 to 24, 21.7% from 25 to 44, 22.3% from 45 to 64, and 24.9% who were 65 years of age or older. The median age was 42 years. For every 100 females, there were 86.8 males. For every 100 females age 18 and over, there were 85.9 males.

The median income for a household in the city was $31,354, and the median income for a family was $37,143. Males had a median income of $29,318 versus $20,313 for females. The per capita income for the city was $14,857. About 4.8% of families and 7.0% of the population were below the poverty line, including 6.3% of those under age 18 and 9.4% of those age 65 or over.

Notable person
Edward H. Harte, journalist

References

External links
 Historic maps of Pilot Grove in the Sanborn Maps of Missouri Collection at the University of Missouri

Cities in Cooper County, Missouri
Cities in Missouri
Columbia metropolitan area (Missouri)